Manorama News is a Malayalam language  free to air news channel owned by Malayala Manorama Company Limited. operated by Malayala Manorama Television (MMTV) the channel, based at Aroor, near Cherthala, Alappuzha, was launched on 17 August 2006.

Johny Lukose is the current News Director of Manorama News. Romy Mathew is the Coordinating Editors of the channel (Heads the Input and Output Functions respectively).

Malayala Manorama Group also operates the Malayalam OTT platform ManoramaMAX.

Programming

Daily programs
Source:

 News
 Pularvela
 Counter Point
 Thiruva Ethirva
 Arogyam

Weekly programs
Source:

 Parayathe Vayya
 Nere Chowe (interview)
 Gulf This Week
 Nallapadham
 Nattupacha
 Veedu

Satellite details
 Manorama News (South, Central & North): Insat 4A 83°E (Frequency: 4115 MHz, Symbol Rate: 7776ksps, Polarization: Horizontal)
 Mazhavil Manorama/Manorama News International: Intelsat 17 66°E (Frequency: 4024 MHz, Symbol Rate: 14400ksps, Polarization: Horizontal)
 Mazhavil Manorama/Manorama News International: Eutelsat 9A 9.0°E (Frequency: 11919 MHz, Symbol Rate: 27500ksps, Polarization: Vertical)

Live streaming 
Official Website (Manorama News)
YouTube Streaming (Manorama News)
ManoramaMAX (OTT)

References

External links 

 

Malayala Manorama group
Malayalam-language television channels
24-hour television news channels in India
Television stations in Thiruvananthapuram
Television channels and stations established in 2006
2006 establishments in Kerala